The National Council of University Students (in  or CNSU) is an advisory body of the Ministry of Education, University and Research (Italy) (in ) of the Italian Republic. Provided for by law no. 59 15th of March 1997., was actually established with the Presidential Decree 2 December 1997, n. 491.

The current President is Luigi Leone Chiapparino of the UDU, a student of the University of Perugia (Central District). The role of Vice President is currently held by Daniele Tagliacozzo, a student of the Roma Tre University (Central District), di Primavera degli Studenti.

Structure
It is an elective body composed of 28 students enrolled in Bachelor degree's and Master degree's courses, a research Doctorate student and a postgraduate. The members are appointed by decree of the Italian Minister of University and Research, remain in office for three years and members cannot be re-elected. Elections for the designation of members take place every three years.

Role
The Council can formulate opinions and proposals to the Italian Minister of University and Research concerning the university world (implementation of reforms, Right to education, funding, news of national importance concerning national universities).

In particular, as written in the Presidential Decree 2 December 1997, n. 491:
 on the reorganization projects of the university system prepared by the Minister;
 on ministerial decrees, which define the general criteria for regulating the teaching systems of university study courses, as well as the methods and tools for orientation and to encourage student mobility;
 on the criteria for assigning and using the ordinary funding fund (in ) and the university rebalancing quota;
 elects eight student representatives to the Consiglio Universitario Nazionale from among its members, and also appoints three members to the advisory committee of the National Agency for the Evaluation of the University and Research System and of the ANDISU (in );
 can make proposals and can be heard by the Minister on other matters of general interest to the university;
 submits to the minister, within one year of taking office, a report on the student status within the university system;
 he can address questions to the minister about facts or events of national importance regarding teaching and the student condition, which will be answered within 60 days.
 The Board elects its own president, a vice president and four members who make up the presidency office.
 The Council is one of the supporter of Civicrazia.

Elections' Results 
Up to now seven national elections have been held, every 3 years: 2019; 2016; 2013; 2010; 2007 and 2004, with the first one held in 2000

Sources 
This article originated as a partial translation of this version of :it:Consiglio Nazionale degli Studenti Universitari, its counterpart in the Italian Wikipedia.

See also
 ANVUR
 Consiglio Universitario Nazionale
 Ministry of Education, University and Research (Italy)

References

External links

Italy
Education in Italy
College and university associations and consortia in Europe
1997 establishments in Italy

Consiglio Nazionale degli Studenti Universitari